Chris Frey Jr. (born June 23, 1995) is a professional American football linebacker. He has been a member of the Carolina Panthers, Hamilton Tiger-Cats, and New Orleans Breakers.

College career
Frey played college football for the Michigan State Spartans from 2014 to 2017. He played in 52 games where he had 193 tackles, 13.5 tackles for a loss, seven sacks, and five fumble recoveries.

Professional career

Carolina Panthers
Frey signed with the Carolina Panthers as an undrafted free agent on April 29, 2018. However, he was released with the final cuts following training camp on September 1, 2018.

Hamilton Tiger-Cats
Frey signed with the Hamilton Tiger-Cats on January 24, 2019. He made the team's active roster following training camp and played in his first career professional game on June 13, 2019, against the Saskatchewan Roughriders. He played in five regular season games where he had three defensive tackles, two special teams tackles, and one sack.

Frey did not play in 2020 due to the cancellation of the 2020 CFL season and signed a contract extension with the Tiger-Cats on January 5, 2021. He played in four regular season games in 2021 where he had two defensive tackles and three special teams tackles. He became a free agent upon the expiry of his contract on February 8, 2022.

New Orleans Breakers
Frey signed with the New Orleans Breakers of the United States Football League on May 10, 2022. He was released on June 8.

References

External links
 Hamilton Tiger-Cats bio

1995 births
Living people
American football linebackers
American players of Canadian football
Canadian football linebackers
Hamilton Tiger-Cats players
Michigan State Spartans football players
New Orleans Breakers (2022) players
People from Upper Arlington, Ohio
Players of American football from Ohio